Strictly Come Dancing returned for its sixteenth series with a launch show on 8 September 2018 on BBC One, and the first live show on 22 September. Tess Daly and Claudia Winkleman returned as hosts, while Zoe Ball returned to host Strictly Come Dancing: It Takes Two on BBC Two. Bruno Tonioli, Craig Revel Horwood, Darcey Bussell and Shirley Ballas returned as judges. On 20 October, actor Alfonso Ribeiro stood in as a guest judge to cover for Tonioli.

In this series, three new dance styles were introduced (contemporary, theatre/jazz and street/commercial) as part of a new category called "couple's choice", giving a total of 18 dance styles in the competition.

The winners were Stacey Dooley and Kevin Clifton, becoming the seventh pair of winners to have never achieved a perfect score. Runners-up Ashley Roberts and Faye Tozer matched Caroline Flack's record in 2014 of scoring perfect 40s for all three dances in the final. Roberts also set a record of achieving the most 40s during a series, with five. Roberts also matched Alexandra Burke’s record of the most 10s during the series, with 32. Tozer also set the record of most consecutive ‘10’ scoring dances, with 11.

The series was Bussell's last series as a judge, with Motsi Mabuse later announced as her replacement. It was also the last series to feature Pasha Kovalev as a professional.

Professional dancers
On 30 May 2018, the list of professionals returning for the sixteenth series was revealed. Professionals from the last series who did not return included Series 1 winner Brendan Cole and Chloe Hewitt. Graziano Di Prima, Johannes Radebe and Luba Mushtuk replaced them. As in the last two series, Neil Jones did not have a celebrity partner. Mushtuk and Radebe also did not have celebrity partners, however, Di Prima did.

Couples
On 13 August 2018, the first three celebrities announced to be participating in the series were Katie Piper, Faye Tozer and Danny John-Jules. Celebrity reveals continued across that month, before concluding on 21 August on Good Morning Britain.

Scoring chart

Average scores table
This table only counts for dances scored on a traditional 40-points scale. The extra points from the Lindy-Hop-a-Thon in Week 10 have been omitted.

Highest and lowest scoring performances of the series
The highest and lowest performances in each dance according to the judges' scale are as follows.

Vick Hope & Danny John-Jules are the only celebrities not to land on this list

Couples' highest and lowest scoring dances

Weekly scores and songs
Unless indicated otherwise, individual judge's scores in the charts below (given in round brackets) are listed in this order from left to right: Craig Revel Horwood, Darcey Bussell, Shirley Ballas, Bruno Tonioli.

Launch show

Musical guests: Nile Rodgers & Chic feat. Craig David & Stefflon Don—"Sober"

Week 1
Running order

Week 2
Musical guest: George Ezra—"Shotgun"
 Running order 

Judges' votes to save

Revel Horwood: Lee & Nadiya
Bussell: Lee & Nadiya
Tonioli: Lee & Nadiya
Ballas: Did not vote, but would have voted to save Lee & Nadiya

Week 3: Movie Week
Musical guest: Gladys Knight—"Licence to Kill"
 Running order 

Judges' votes to save

Revel Horwood: Charles & Karen
Bussell: Charles & Karen
Tonioli: Charles & Karen

Ballas: Did not vote, but would have voted to save Lee & Nadiya

Week 4
 Musical guests: Backstreet Boys—"Larger than Life"/"I Want It That Way"/"Everybody (Backstreet's Back)"
 Running order 

Judges' votes to save

Revel Horwood: Charles & Karen
Bussell: Charles & Karen
Tonioli: Charles & Karen 
Ballas: Did not vote, but would have voted to save Charles & Karen

Week 5
Individual judge's scores given in the chart below (given in parentheses) are listed in this order from left to right: Craig Revel Horwood, Darcey Bussell, Shirley Ballas, Alfonso Ribeiro.

Musical guest: Paloma Faith—"Loyal"
Running order 

Judges' votes to save

Revel Horwood: Vick & Graziano
Bussell: Seann & Katya
Ribeiro: Seann & Katya
Ballas: Seann & Katya

Week 6: Halloween Week
Musical guest: Rita Ora—"Let You Love Me"
 Running order 

Judges' votes to save

Revel Horwood: Graeme & Oti
Bussell: Graeme & Oti
Tonioli: Graeme & Oti
Ballas: Did not vote, but would have voted to save Graeme & Oti

Week 7
Musical guests: The Kingdom Choir—Aretha Franklin medley; Jess Glynne—"Thursday"
 Running order 

Judges' votes to save

Revel Horwood: Dr. Ranj & Janette
Bussell: Charles & Karen
Tonioli: Charles & Karen
Ballas: Charles & Karen

Week 8
Musical guests: RAF Spitfires Choir—"Rise Up"; Andrea and Matteo Bocelli—"Fall on Me"
 Running order 

Judges' votes to save

Revel Horwood: Danny & Amy
Bussell: Graeme & Oti
Tonioli: Graeme & Oti
Ballas: Graeme & Oti

Week 9: Blackpool Week
Musical guests: Gloria Estefan—"Dr. Beat"/"Conga"/"Rhythm Is Gonna Get You"/"1–2–3"/"Get on Your Feet medley"; Take That—"Out of Our Heads"
 Running order 

Judges' votes to save

Revel Horwood: Graeme & Oti
Bussell: Graeme & Oti
Tonioli: Graeme & Oti
Ballas: Did not vote, but would have voted to save Graeme & Oti

Week 10
Musical guest: Rod Stewart—"Farewell"
Running order 

Judges' votes to save

Revel Horwood: Ashley & Pasha
Bussell: Ashley & Pasha
Tonioli: Ashley & Pasha
Ballas: Did not vote, but would have voted to save Ashley & Pasha

Week 11: Musicals Week (Quarter-final)
Musical guests: Trevor Dion Nicholas—"The Rhythm of Life"; Adam Lambert—"We Are the Champions"
 Running order 

Judges' votes to save

Revel Horwood: Ashley & Pasha
Bussell: Ashley & Pasha
Tonioli: Ashley & Pasha
Ballas: Did not vote, but would have voted to save Ashley & Pasha

Week 12: Semi-final
Musical guests: Little Mix—"Woman Like Me"
Running order

For the Dance Off, Ashley & Pasha chose to dance their American Smooth, while Lauren & AJ chose to dance their Tango.
Judges' votes to save

Revel Horwood: Ashley & Pasha
Bussell: Ashley & Pasha
Tonioli: Ashley & Pasha
Ballas: Did not vote, but would have voted to save Ashley & Pasha

Week 13: Final

Musical guest: Michael Bublé—"Such a Night"
Running order

Dance chart

 Highest scoring dance
 Lowest scoring dance

Week 1: Cha-Cha-Cha, Foxtrot, Jive, Quickstep, Samba, Tango, Viennese Waltz or Waltz
Week 2: One unlearned dance (introducing American Smooth, Charleston, Paso Doble and Salsa)
Week 3 (Movie Week): One unlearned dance
Week 4: One unlearned dance (introducing Rumba)
Week 5: One unlearned dance (introducing Contemporary and Street/Commercial)
Week 6 (Halloween Week): One unlearned dance (introducing Theatre/Jazz)
Week 7: One unlearned dance (introducing Argentine Tango)
Week 8: One unlearned dance
Week 9 (Blackpool Week): One unlearned dance
Week 10: One unlearned dance and Lindy Hop-a-thon
Week 11 (Musicals Week): One unlearned dance
Week 12 (Semi-final): Two unlearned dances
Week 13 (Final): Judges' choice, showdance and couple's favourite dance

Viewership

Weekly ratings for each show on BBC One. All ratings are provided by BARB.

References

External links

2018 British television seasons
Series 16